The Compton–Belkovich Thorium Anomaly is a hotspot (volcanic complex) on the Moon. It is on the far side of the Moon and was found by a gamma-ray spectrometer in 1998. It is an area of concentrated thorium, a 'fertile' element. Lunar rock samples from the Apollo missions reveal that most lunar volcanism occurred around 3 to 4 billion years ago, but this feature could have formed as recently as 1 billion years ago due to the unknown history of the moon's far side.

Description
It has unusually high reflectance, identified by a visible imaging study that was carried out later by the Clementine spacecraft in a Clementine Visible Images study. High resolution images from the Lunar Reconnaissance Orbiter LRO made it possible to analyze the surface features of the Compton–Belkovich Thorium Anomaly in 2011.

Location

Features
In the center of the elevated region is a depression; this is bounded by scarps and may be some kind of caldera.
Just to the north is a feature called Little Dome,  in diameter. Further north is an elongated dome, oriented north-south, called Middle Dome. Both Little Dome and Middle Dome have boulders on top that may be volcanic blocks. Big Dome is further to the north at the edge of the anomaly.

This may be a pyroclastic flow. This more highly reflective area also matches an area that shows a Christiansen feature with shorter wavelength. It reflects more strongly in the 7.1 to 7.5 μm range, which indicates quartz or alkali feldspar is the major constituent.

Explosive remains also appear scattered to the east for about 300 km covering an area of 70,000 km2.

Volcanic slope
Volcanic features provide information about the composition of the lava that formed the Compton–Belkovich Thorium Anomaly. On average, many volcanoes on the Moon have slopes of lower than 7 degrees. However, the Compton–Belkovich Thorium Anomaly has a slope which reaches 25 degrees at the highest. This suggests that the region was formed by more viscous lava.

Composition
Using infrared reflectance data from Clementine at 750 nm and 950 nm, the level of iron oxide was determined to be about 3% by mass.

Formation
A direct analysis of Apollo program samples revealed that most lunar volcanism occurred around 3 to 4 billion years ago. However, volcanic activity on the unsampled lunar back side could have occurred around 1 billion years ago. The smoothness of the surface associated with the anomaly indicates that it could possibly have been formed in a more recent event.

As the lava cooled, it would have crystallized to produce a silicate structure; incompatible elements such as thorium would have been excluded from the process and formed thorium-rich pockets in the remaining liquid rock. The eruption associated with the thorium anomaly could have created the elevated features to the west and the low and broad area to the east. The latest possible eruptions of lava would have made domes with steeper slopes, and also would have caused small bulges, as they would barely reach the surface.

See also
Volcanism on the Moon

References

Further reading

 

Thorium
NASA
LQ06 quadrangle
Lunar observation
Hotspots (geology)
Magnetic anomalies
Volcanoes on the Moon
Extraterrestrial volcanic calderas